The Blind Owl (French: La chouette aveugle) is a 1987 art film directed by Chilean filmmaker Raúl Ruiz. It is an oneiric, metafictional work with some scenes and characters loosely based on the 1937 book The Blind Owl by the Persian writer Sadegh Hedayat.

References

External links

1987 films
French fantasy drama films
Films directed by Raúl Ruiz
Films based on works by Sadegh Hedayat
1980s French films